Alexander Stewart was a Scottish footballer who played as a centre forward who played for several clubs including St Johnstone and Motherwell.

His most enduring achievement was being the scorer of six goals in a Scottish Football League Division One match for Motherwell against Celtic in April 1937 – the match finished 8–0 and remains the Glasgow club's record margin of defeat. Stewart was called up for the Scottish League XI at the start of the following season and played against England's Football League XI, his sole appearance at that level, after impressing in a trial match two weeks earlier. He had been capped once by the Scotland amateur team in 1929 while establishing himself with St Mirren, and before that had been picked twice for the Scotland Junior international team in 1927.

He later coached hometown club St Johnstone for two seasons, working with Bobby Brown.

Stewart's father, also named Alex, was also a footballer who played as a goalkeeper and was also capped once by the SFL XI.

References

Scottish footballers
Year of birth missing
Year of death missing
Association football forwards
Footballers from Perth, Scotland
Scottish Football League players
Southern Football League players
Scottish Junior Football Association players
Motherwell F.C. players
St Mirren F.C. players
Falkirk F.C. players
St Johnstone F.C. players
Queen's Park F.C. players
Rhyl F.C. players
Sheffield United F.C. players
Dumbarton F.C. wartime guest players
Clapton Orient F.C. wartime guest players
Dundee United F.C. wartime guest players
Colchester United F.C. players
Scotland amateur international footballers
Scotland junior international footballers
Scottish Football League representative players